A division, sometimes called a business sector or business unit (segment), is one of the parts into which a business, organization or company is divided.

Overview 
Divisions are distinct parts of a business. If these divisions are all part of the same company, then that company is legally responsible for all of the obligations and debts of the divisions.

In the banking industry, an example would be East West Bancorp and its primary subsidiary, East West Bank.

Legal responsibility 

Subsidiaries are separate, distinct legal entities for the purposes of taxation, regulation and liability. For this reason, they differ from divisions, which are businesses fully integrated within the main company, and not legally or otherwise distinct from it. The Houston Chronicle highlighted that the creation of a division "is substantially easier than developing subsidiaries. Because a division is an internal segment of a company, not an entirely separate entity, business owners create and end divisions at their whim. Also, because individuals in each division are employed by the same company, it's easier to modify staffing to fit with this setup".

See also
Brand
Subsidiary

References

Types of business entity